The Ymyyakhtakh culture was a Late Neolithic culture of Siberia, with a very large archaeological horizon, dating to c. 2200–1300 BC. Its origins seem to be in the Lena river basin of Yakutia, and also along the Yenisei river. From there it spread to the east and west. Individual sites were also found in Taymyr.

It is named after Ymyyakhtakh, a settlement in the Sakha Republic, Russia.

Description 
A. Golovnev discusses Ymyyakhtakh culture in the context of a “circumpolar syndrome”:

"... some features of the East Siberian Ymyyakhtakh culture spread amazingly quickly as far as Scandinavia. Ceramics with wafer prints are found at the Late Bronze Age monuments of the Taimyr Peninsula, Yamal Peninsula, Bolshezemelskaya and Malozemelskaya tundra, the Kola Peninsula, and Finland (not to mention East Siberia and North-East Asia)."

The Ymyyakhtakh made round-bottomed ceramics with waffle and ridge prints on the outer surface. Stone and bone arrowheads, spears and harpoons are richly represented. Armour plates were also used in warfare. Finds of bronze ware are frequent in the burial grounds.

The culture was formed by the tribes migrating from the shores of Lake Baikal to the north, merging with the local substrate of the Bel'kachi culture.

The carriers of culture are identified either with the Yukaghirs ethnic group, or perhaps with the Chukchi and Koryaks. The Ymyyakhtakh culture continued at least until the first centuries of our era. It was later replaced by the Ust-Mil culture.

Migrations 
After 1,700 BC, the Ymyyakhtakh culture is believed to have spread to the east as far as the Chukotka peninsula, where it was in cultural contact with the Eskimo–Aleut language speakers, and the Paleo-Eskimos.

A ceramic complex comparable to the Ymyyakhtakh culture (typified by pottery with an admixture of wool) is also found in northern Fennoscandia near the end of the second millennium BC.

See also 

 Prehistory of Siberia
 Syalakh culture

References

Further reading 
 Fedoseeva S. A. The Ymyakhtakh Culture of Northeastern Asia

Archaeology of Siberia
Siberia
Siberia